The languages of Uttar Pradesh generally belong to two zones in the Indo-Aryan languages, Central and East. There are approximately 29 languages spoken in Uttar Pradesh. Hindi is the state's official standard and Urdu is co-official, and according to census data, together the Hindustani language is spoken by % of the population. Bhojpuri is the second most spoken language of the state, it is spoken by almost 11% of the population. However, Hindi is a wide label that covers many dialects, which may or may not be considered separate languages and may or may not be fully mutually intelligible. These include Awadhi, Braj Bhasha, Bundeli, Bagheli, Kannauji.

Inventories

Linguists generally distinguish the terms "language" and "dialects" on the basis of 'mutual comprehension'. The Indian census uses two specific classifications in a distinctive way: (1) 'language' and (2) 'mother tongue'. The 'mother tongues' are grouped within each 'language'. Many 'mother tongues' so defined would be considered a language rather than a dialect by linguistic standards. This is specifically the case for many 'mother tongues' with tens of millions of speakers that are officially grouped under the 'language' Hindi.

Official languages

The languages of state administration are Hindi, established by the Uttar Pradesh Official Language Act, 1951, and Urdu, established by the Amendment to the same in 1989.

Writing systems

Devanagari is the main script used to write Uttar Pradesh languages, although Urdu is written in the Nastaliq style of the Perso-Arabic script. Kaithi was widely used historically.

The Nagari Pracharini Sabha was formed in 1893 to promote the usage of the Devanagari script.

Footnotes and references

See 

Languages of India
Bhojpuri language
Uttar Pradesh

External links
 http://www.languageinindia.com/
 Languages of India (SIL Ethnologue list)
Languages and Scripts of India
Reconciling Linguistic Diversity: The History and the Future of Language Policy in India by Jason Baldridge
Titus - Languages of India
Diversity of Languages in India
KeyTrans Hindi intelligent transliteration email and spell check

 
Languages of India